Okkonen is a Finnish surname. Notable people with the surname include:

 Onni Okkonen (1886–1962), Finnish art historian
 Jarkko Okkonen (born 1978), Finnish football defender
 Antti Okkonen (born 1982), Finnish football player

Finnish-language surnames